Deh Chol or Deh-e Chol may refer to:
 Deh Chol-e Ka Abdel
 Deh-e Chol-e Delita